Ann-Louise Carina Edstrand (born April 26, 1975, in Örnsköldsvik, Sweden) is an ice hockey player from Sweden. She won a silver medal at the 2006 Winter Olympics and a bronze medal at the 2002 Winter Olympics. In 2016, she was elected to the Swedish Hockey Hall of Fame.

References

1975 births
Living people
Ice hockey players at the 1998 Winter Olympics
Ice hockey players at the 2002 Winter Olympics
Ice hockey players at the 2006 Winter Olympics
Medalists at the 2002 Winter Olympics
Medalists at the 2006 Winter Olympics
Olympic bronze medalists for Sweden
Olympic ice hockey players of Sweden
Olympic medalists in ice hockey
Olympic silver medalists for Sweden
People from Örnsköldsvik Municipality
Swedish women's ice hockey players
Sportspeople from Västernorrland County
20th-century Swedish women
21st-century Swedish women